The Skinny is a 2012 American romantic comedy-drama film directed by Patrik-Ian Polk, the creator of the Logo television series, Noah's Arc. It was released on April 6, 2012, in select theaters.

Plot

The film tells the story of five friends who are Brown University classmates—four gay men and one lesbian—as they reunite in New York City for a tumultuous Gay Pride weekend. Magnus (Jussie Smollett), an affluent young medical student, is happily in a five-month relationship with his boyfriend, Ryan (Dustin Ross). Magnus's Brown University college friends join him in New York City for Gay Pride for the weekend: lesbian Yale University PhD student and gay-porn aficionado Langston (Shanika Warren-Markland); innocent and sometimes childlike Sebastian (Blake Young-Fountain), who has just come back from a year in Paris paid for by his parents' trust fund; promiscuous Kyle (Anthony Burrell), now living in Los Angeles and enjoying a career in film production; and witty and sarcastic Joey (Jeffrey Bowyer-Chapman).

Cast
 Jussie Smollett as Magnus
 Blake Young-Fountain as Sebastian
 Shanika Warren-Markland as Langston
 Jeffrey Bowyer-Chapman as Joey
 Anthony Burrell as Kyle
 Jennia Fredrique as Savannah
 Dustin Ross as Ryan
 Robb Sherman as Junot
 B. Scott as Candy
 Darryl Stephens as Nurse
 Seth Gilliam as HIV testing worker
 Wilson Cruz as Dr. Velasquez
 Derrick L. Briggs as Rapist #1
 Dewayne Queen as Rapist #2
 Zeric Armenteros
 Bassey Ikpi as herself
 Phat Daddy
 Hot Rod

Release 
The film screened at several festivals and has a limited theatrical run before premiered on Logo on July 8, 2012.

Reception 
The film received mixed reviews from critics upon release. Variety reviewed the film; critic Dennis Harvey dubbed the film a "likable seriocomic ensembler". Further, Harvey wrote: "Performers, including several prior Polk players, make for pleasant company. Production values are decent on a budget, though the Manhattan setting isn’t used to maximum advantage." The Hollywood Reporter praised the film's depiction of gay black men, but criticized some of the vulgarity, concluding that the film "deals refreshingly, if at times too candidly, with the love lives of black gay characters".

See also
List of black films of the 2010s

References

External links
 
 

2012 films
Films about gay male pornography
Films about pornography
2012 romantic comedy-drama films
American LGBT-related films
American romantic comedy-drama films
African-American LGBT-related films
African-American romance films
Films set in New York (state)
Films set in New York City
American independent films
2012 LGBT-related films
Films directed by Patrik-Ian Polk
2012 comedy films
2012 drama films
2010s English-language films
2010s American films